This is a list of the 13 members of the European Parliament for Finland in the 2014 to 2019 session.

List

Party representation

Midterm replacements
 Alexander Stubb declined his seat to become the Prime Minister of Finland. He was replaced by Petri Sarvamaa.
 Olli Rehn was replaced by Hannu Takkula in April 2015.
 Sampo Terho was replaced by Pirkko Ruohonen-Lerner in May 2015.
 Hannu Takkula was replaced by Elsi Katainen in March 2018.
 Paavo Väyrynen was replaced by Mirja Vehkaperä in June 2018.

Notes

External links
Finnish Ministry of Justice election results

Finland
List
2014